Anthropology Southern Africa is a quarterly peer-reviewed academic journal published by Routledge on behalf of the association "Anthropology Southern Africa". It was established in 1978 as the Suid-Afrikaanse Tydskrif vir Etnologie/South African Journal of Ethnology, obtaining its current name in 2002. Since 2014, the journal has been co-published by Routledge and NISC (National Inquiry Services Centre) on behalf of the association. It covers ethnographic and theoretical research in social and cultural anthropology in Southern Africa, a subfield of African studies. The editors-in-chief in 2023 are Teresa Connor (University of Fort Hare), Sethunya Tshepho Mosime (University of Botswana), and Leah Junck (University of Cape Town).

Abstracting and indexing
The journal is abstracted and indexed in Anthropological Literature, EBSCO databases, Scopus, and the Social Science Citation Index. According to the Journal Citation Reports, the journal has a 2021 impact factor of 0.579.

References

External links
 

English-language journals
Publications established in 1978
Quarterly journals
African studies journals
Routledge academic journals